The Iroquois Handicap run at Belmont Park on Long Island, New York in the fall of the year, is a  race for Thoroughbred fillies and mares, aged three and up, that are New York-bred. It offers a purse of $125,000.

Set at a mile and an eighth before 1981, at a mile from 1981 to 1984, a mile and 70 yards from 1985 to 1987, at six furlongs from 1989 to 1993, it is now at seven furlongs.  In 1996, it ran at Aqueduct Racetrack.

The Iroquois Handicap is named for the Iroquois Indian Nation who still inhabit some of the region that now includes central New York State.

Records
Speed record:  (at current distance of 7 furlongs)
 1:21.87 – Cluster of Stars (2013)

Most wins:
 3 – Lottsa Talc (1994, 1995, 1996)
2 – La Verdad (2014, 2015

Most wins by a jockey:
 3 – Michael Luzzi (2003, 2005, 2008)
3 – José Ortiz (2014, 2015, 2019)
3 – Javier Castellano (2011, 2013, 2016)

Most wins by a trainer:
 3 – H. Allen Jerkens (1980, 1984, 1985)

Most wins by an owner:
 2 – Hobeau Farm (1984, 1985)
 2 – W. Alec Martusewicz (1986, 1987)
 2 – Vincent McGuire & Charles (1995, 1996)

Winners

References

1979 establishments in New York (state)
Listed stakes races in the United States
Sprint category horse races for fillies and mares
Belmont Park
Recurring sporting events established in 1979
Horse races in New York (state)